Popstrangers are Joel Flyger (guitar/vocals/saxophone/synthesiser), Adam Page (bass) and David Larson (drums), three native New Zealanders who now reside in London.

Popstrangers formed after meeting through mutual friends, with a shared interest in 80's New Zealand punk bands and most importantly, a desire to create music with like-minded people.

After releasing several singles on fabled New Zealand label Flying Nun, Popstrangers delivered their debut album Antipodes in 2013. Recorded in the basement of a 1930's dancehall, Antipodes features dissonant, claustrophobic melodies, anchored by the languid affectations of Flyger's vocals. Sophomore effort Fortuna soon followed in 2014, further developing the band's nuanced, distorted "pop" and released to much critical acclaim .

Popstrangers release album titled In Spirit in June 2022 on Rice Is Nice Records. The album features 10 songs.

External links 
 Official website (archived in January 2017)

New Zealand rock music groups
2009 establishments in New Zealand
Carpark Records artists